Hajj Sa'id al-Shawwa (1868–October 1930) was a Palestinian Arab politician and the first mayor of Gaza, serving from 1906 to 1917. He was also one of the most influential members of the Supreme Muslim Council from 1921 until his death. He was an opponent of British mandatory rule in Palestine, supporting the Ottomans during World War I and later the nationalist Grand Mufti of Jerusalem, Amin al-Husayni.

Political career

Mayor of Gaza
Al-Shawwa was born into the prominent Shawwa family of Gaza, and his father Mohammed Khalil Al-Shawwa served as the chairman of the Municipality of Gaza when it was founded in 1893. Before entering politics, Sa'id was involved in a career as a grain exporter. In 1904, he was appointed a member of the municipal council and in 1906, he became the city's first mayor. During his reign as mayor he built a hospital, several mosques and schools in Gaza, and is credited with introducing the modern plow to the city in 1911. Al-Shawa developed close relationships with the Ottoman Army during World War I and was awarded honorary decorations by the Ottoman authorities. His sympathy with the Ottomans during the war caused the victorious British Army to depose him in 1917.

Activity with Supreme Muslim Council
Al-Shawwa represented Gaza at the 1st, 4th and 5th Palestinian National Congress held in 1919, 1920 and 1922. In 1921, shortly after the founding of the Supreme Muslim Council, al-Shawwa was elected as one of the four members of the council's electoral college—the highest-ranking body. He was chosen to represent the Gaza, southern Palestine, and the District of Jerusalem from 1922 to 1929. By then, al-Shawwa was a major landowner in Gaza, as well as Beersheba, owning a total of roughly 50,000 dunams. In 1926–27, he took charge in the restoration of the Great Mosque of Gaza after it was mostly destroyed by British bombardment during the World War. Al-Shawwa died in 1930 and was replaced Muhi ad-Din 'Abd al-Shafi, a Muslim scholar and opponent of al-Husayni.

References

Bibliography

1868 births
1930 deaths
Arab people in Mandatory Palestine
Mayors of Gaza City
Arabs in Ottoman Palestine